The 2018–19 Magyar Kupa, known as  for sponsorship reasons, was the 61st edition of the tournament.

Schedule
The rounds of the 2018–19 competition are scheduled as follows:

Matches
A total of 45 matches were take place, starting with First round on 7 September 2018 and culminating with the Final on 17 March 2019.

First round
The first round ties was scheduled for 7–12 September 2018.

|-
!colspan="3" style="background:#ccccff;"| 7 September

|-
!colspan="3" style="background:#ccccff;"| 8 September

|-
!colspan="3" style="background:#ccccff;"| 11 September

|-
!colspan="3" style="background:#ccccff;"| 12 September

|}

Second round
The second round ties was scheduled for 27 September – 3 October 2018.

|-
!colspan="3" style="background:#ccccff;"| 27 September

|-
!colspan="3" style="background:#ccccff;"| 28 September

|-
!colspan="3" style="background:#ccccff;"| 2 October

|-
!colspan="3" style="background:#ccccff;"| 3 October

|}

Third round
The third round ties was scheduled for 17–24 October 2018.

|-
!colspan="3" style="background:#ccccff;"| 17 October

|-
!colspan="3" style="background:#ccccff;"| 22 October

|-
!colspan="3" style="background:#ccccff;"| 24 October

|}

Fourth round
The fourth round ties was scheduled for 6–14 November 2018.

|-
!colspan="3" style="background:#ccccff;"| 6 November

|-
!colspan="3" style="background:#ccccff;"| 7 November

|-
!colspan="3" style="background:#ccccff;"| 8 November

|-
!colspan="3" style="background:#ccccff;"| 13 November

|-
!colspan="3" style="background:#ccccff;"| 14 November

|}

Fifth round
The fifth round ties was scheduled for 8–13 February 2019.

|-
!colspan="3" style="background:#ccccff;"| 8 February

|-
!colspan="3" style="background:#ccccff;"| 9 February

|-
!colspan="3" style="background:#ccccff;"| 13 February

|}

Final four
The final four will be held on 16–17 March 2019 at the Főnix Hall in Debrecen.

Awards
Most valuable player:  Nycke Groot
Best Goalkeeper: ?

Semi-finals

Bronze medal match

Final

Final standings

See also
 2018–19 Nemzeti Bajnokság I
 2018–19 Nemzeti Bajnokság I/B
 2018–19 Nemzeti Bajnokság II

References

External links
 Hungarian Handball Federaration
 handball.hu

Magyar Kupa Women